Anatoly Bykhovsky (born November 19, 1988) is a Russian-born chess grandmaster since 2010 and an International Master since 2008. He is the 23rd best player in Israel and 995th player in the world. His highest rating was 2536 (in November 2011).

In 2012, Bykhovsky participated in the National Open. He ended the tournament with a 4.5 score and 5th in rankings. He also competed in the Pro Chess League on Chess.com in 2018.

References

External links
 

1988 births
Israeli chess players
Chess grandmasters
Sportspeople from Samara, Russia
Living people